The 1980 ATP Championship, also known as the Cincinnati Open, was a men's tennis tournament played on outdoor hard courts at the Lindner Family Tennis Center in Mason, Ohio in the United States that was part of the 1980 Volvo Grand Prix. It was the 80th edition of the tournament and was held from August 18 through August 24, 1980. Third-seeded Harold Solomon won the singles title.

Finals

Singles
 Harold Solomon defeated  Francisco González 7–6, 6–3
 It was Solomon's 3rd singles title of the year and the 21st of his career.

Doubles
 Bruce Manson /  Brian Teacher defeated  Wojtek Fibak /  Ivan Lendl 6–7, 7–5, 6–4

References

External links
 
 ATP tournament profile
 ITF tournament edition details

Cincinnati Open
Cincinnati Masters
Cincinnati Open
Cincin
Cincinnati Open